MVP (short for "Most Valuable Playas") was a hip hop act from New York. The line-up of the group featured an R&B singer from The Bronx, Vice Verse (a.k.a. Victor Matos); MC Stagga Lee (a.k.a. Eric Newman); and Robert Clivillés (a.k.a. Rob Dinero/Rich Kid).

The group released two albums, Stagga Lee presents MVP (Casablanca/Universal Records, 2003) (when the line-up contained four more members: Mighty Max, Jasmine Ray, J.R.X.L. and Fatts Bronston) and Hip Hop, Clubs, Girls & Life Vol. 1 (Positiva/EMI Records, 2006).

The group's debut single, "Roc Ya Body (Mic Check 1 2)" was a hit in Europe. It reached No. 5 in the United Kingdom in July 2005. "Bounce, Shake, Move, Stop!" was the second single, and reached No. 22 on the UK Singles Chart and No. 43 on the Irish Singles Chart in 2006. The group has released no further singles.

See also
Robert Clivillés
C+C Music Factory

References

External links
Official website
Robert Clivilles Interview 2004
	

American hip hop groups